Piia Pasanen (born 17 April 1973, in Kuopio) is a Finnish journalist and Yle's news anchor. She previously worked as a sports reporter for Urheiluruutu, later she became a TV news reporter. She also hosted Yle TV2's Poliisi:tv in the 1990s and Tango Market in the 2010s. She has hosted the Independence Day Reception on Finnish Independence Day in the 2000s and 2010.

Pasanen's spouse is Tomi Einonen, editor-in-chief of MTV Uutiset. The couple has two children.

References 

1973 births
Living people
Finnish television presenters
People from Kuopio